All Over the Place is the second studio album by English YouTuber, boxer, entrepreneur, singer and rapper KSI. It was released by RBC Records and BMG on 16 July 2021. The album features guest appearances from Future, 21 Savage, Yungblud, Polo G, Anne-Marie, Digital Farm Animals, Craig David, Jay1, Deno, Gracey, Bugzy Malone, Rico Love, Lil Durk, and S-X. The deluxe edition was released on 27 August 2021. It features additional guest appearances from A1 x J1, Nevve, and Lil Wayne. Production was handled by a variety of record producers, including Digital Farm Animals, S-X, Matt Schwartz, Jacob Manson, Toddla T, Show N Prove, Don Corleon, Jake Gosling, Diztortion, and Quix, among others.

The album was preceded by the UK top three singles, "Really Love", "Don't Play", "Patience", and "Holiday". For the deluxe edition, it was preceded by only one single, "Lose". The album debuted atop the UK Albums Chart. In promotion, KSI performed a live concert, the KSI show the day after the release of the standard edition. His friends and fellow musicians, such as Digital Farm Animals, S-X, AJ Tracey, and others participated in the event.

Release and promotion
All Over the Place was preceded by four UK top ten singles:

"Really Love", featuring English singer-songwriter Craig David and English record producer Digital Farm Animals, was released on 23 October 2020 as the album's lead single and it debuted at number three on the UK Singles Chart.

"Don't Play", a collaboration with English singer-songwriter Anne-Marie and Digital Farm Animals, was released on 15 January 2021 as the second single and it debuted at number two on the UK Singles Chart.

"Patience", featuring English singer-songwriter Yungblud and American rapper Polo G, was released on 12 March 2021 as the third single and it debuted at number three on the UK Singles Chart.

"Holiday" was released on 18 June 2021 as the album's fourth single and it debuted at number two on the UK Singles Chart.

British rapper Jay1's single "Swerve", which features a guest appearance from KSI, was released as the fifth single on 2 July 2021 and is included on the Platinum VIP edition of the album.

The lead and only single for the deluxe edition, "Lose", a collaboration with American rapper Lil Wayne, was released on 6 August 2021.

KSI headlined The SSE Arena, Wembley on 25 February 2022 in support of the album.

The KSI Show 
To accompany the album's release, KSI headlined a livestream concert titled The KSI Show, which aired on the Moment House platform on 17 July 2021. KSI enlisted the help of Anne-Marie, Big Zuu, Craig David, Deno, Digital Farm Animals, Ella Henderson, Jay1, Nathan Dawe, Randolph, S-X, Swarmz, Tion Wayne and Yungblud as guest performers. AJ Tracey, Dan Bilzerian, Emile Heskey, Jonathan Ross, Logan Paul, Lorraine Kelly and the Sidemen also made guest appearances during the concert.

The KSI Show featured custom-built stages, costume changes and choreography by Black Skull Creative. The show also featured comedy sketches, written by KSI with Joe Chandler, Nick Wegener and James Farmer, who are notable for their work on the American animated sitcom, American Dad! A pre-show red carpet event, presented by Abbie McCarthy, was livestreamed to KSI's YouTube channel in the run-up to the main show.

Tour

Notes

Critical reception 

All Over the Place received generally positive reviews from critics. AnyDecentMusic stated the summary of other ratings and Metacritic did the same, but gave one positive review, three mixed reviews, and zero negative reviews.

Writing for Clash, Robin Murray gave the album a 7 out of 10, explaining that it "follows hot on the heels of his controversial debut, and the project's breadth and diversity definitely lives up to its title" and  "a record marked by diversity, 'All Over The Place' is held together by its makers ambitions". Dale Maplethorpe of Gigwise felt that it is sort of a hit and miss, praising its diversity, and stated that "KSI is brilliant at making 'summer bops'", citing the songs "Don't Play", "Really Love", and "Gang Gang" as examples. Kyann-Sian Williams of NME magazine gave the album 3 stars out of 5, stating that KSI "makes another honest attempt at a pop–rap". Kadish Morris from The Observer rated it 3 stars out of 5, providing fidgets from genre to genre, "UK garage to drill, pop to Afro swing, but never quite finds its resting place". Writing for the Independent, Annabel Nugent gave it a 3 out of 5, stating that "is a bumper-to-bumper blending of genres buoyed along by some of music's major-leaguers". Imogen Lawlor gave it a 3.5 out of 5 and stated that the album is "clearly structured as KSI effortlessly navigates numerous genres" and "given that he covers so many genres (with varying success), KSI's credentials as a 'hip hop sensation' are questionable".

Commercial performance 
In the United Kingdom, All Over the Place debuted at number one on the UK Albums Chart, giving KSI his first chart-topper in the country, with first week sales of 34,328 album-equivalent units. 18,421 came from physical copies, with 5,227 of them being vinyl units. The album gathered 20.9 million streams, equating to an additional 13,389 units. It has been certified Gold by the BPI for surpassing 100,000 units in the country.

Track listing

Credits and personnel 
Credits adapted from Tidal.

 KSIvocals , songwriting , hand clap 
 S-Xproduction , songwriting (15), engineering , vocals 
 Adam Lunnengineering 
 Joe LaPortaengineering 
 Niko Marzoucaengineering 
 Rob MacFarlaneengineering 
 Robert Marksengineering 
 Futuresongwriting , vocals 
 21 Savagesongwriting , vocals 
 Diego Aveproduction , songwriting 
 Bankroll Got Itproduction , songwriting 
 Mally Mallproduction , songwriting 
 Nana Roguesproduction , songwriting 
 Chambersproduction , songwriting 
 Rico Lovesongwriting , vocals 
 Ivory Scottsongwriting 
 Aaron Ferruccisongwriting 
 Kevin Graingerengineering 
 Matt Schwartzsongwriting , production , engineering 
 Yungbludsongwriting , vocals 
 Polo Gsongwriting , vocals 
 Digital Farm Animalsproduction , songwriting , bass , drums , keyboards , percussion , piano , programming , sound effects , strings , synthesizer , backing vocals , hand clap 
 Red Trianglesongwriting 
 Yamisongwriting 
 Yoshiproduction , songwriting 
 Peter Jideonwosongwriting 
 John Hanesengineering 
 Serban Gheneaengineering 
 Mojamproduction , songwriting , drums , keyboards , programming , sound effects , synthesizer 
 Anne-Mariesongwriting , vocals 
 Andrew Murraysongwriting , harp , strings 
 Richard Boardmansongwriting 
 Pablo Bowmansongwriting 
 Cameron Gower Pooleengineering 
 Craig Davidsongwriting , vocals 
 MNEKsongwriting 
 KABBAsongwriting 
 Ashley Livingstonesongwriting 
 Paul Newmansongwriting 
 Eugene Nwohiasongwriting 
 Ronald Nwohiasongwriting 
 Steve Wickhamsongwriting 
 Denosongwriting , vocals 
 Jay1songwriting , vocals 
 AJ Productionsproduction , songwriting 
 Jacob Mansonproduction , songwriting 
 Eight9FLYsongwriting 
 Graceysongwriting , vocals 
 Toddla Tproduction , songwriting 
 Adrian McLeodsongwriting 
 M1 on the Beatproduction , songwriting 
 Bugzy Malonesongwriting , vocals 
 Toddla Tproduction , songwriting 
 Don Corleonproduction , songwriting 
 Lil Durksongwriting , vocals 
 Ayo Beatzproduction , songwriting 
 Joseph Goslingsongwriting 
 Jake Goslingproduction , songwriting , drums , keyboard , hand clap , percussion , programming 
 William Vaughansongwriting , electric guitar 
 Matthew Brettledrums , guitar , percussion , programming , engineering 
 Geoff Swanengineering 
 Dillon Deskinsongwriting 
 William Egan IVsongwriting 
 Diztortionproduction , songwriting 
 Trobiproduction , songwriting 
 Dukusmixing , mastering 
 Sam Harperengineering

Charts

Weekly charts

Year-end charts

Certifications

Release history

References 

2021 albums
KSI albums
RBC Records albums
BMG Rights Management albums
Pop-rap albums
Albums produced by Digital Farm Animals